According to experts, the total number of individuals with HIV (including those who are undiagnosed) was estimated in 2016 to be between 0.85 and 1.5 million (the lower estimate is from the Ministry of Healthcare of the Russian Federation). As for 2016, the prevalence of HIV in adult people was between 0.8 and 1%, and according to the UN, Russia had one of the fastest growing HIV/AIDS epidemics in the world. Approximately 95,000 Russians were diagnosed with HIV in 2015, and approximately 75,000 in the first nine months of 2016. Stigma surrounding the disease, and government indifference have contributed to the crisis. As of 2016 the HIV/AIDS epidemic, despite successes with intravenous drug users, was poised to move into the general population of sexually active young people.

USSR
The first officially documented case of HIV in Russia (then the Soviet Union) was diagnosed in March 1987.  The patient zero was registered in Kalmykia; his name was Vladimir Krasichkov, a military translator who previously visited People's Republic of the Congo.

The first case was followed by the Elista HIV outbreak in 1988, when 270 patients, mostly children, were infected with HIV-1 subtype G virus. The infection was mainly transmitted between children through contaminated catheters, needles, and from children to mothers via breastfeeding.

Due to nature of post-war Soviet Political regime the policy of denial and repression of HIV diagnoses it had adopted not only inhibited an effective government response to the epidemic, but also inhibited the recording of accurate statistics. There is a lack of accurate data on people infected with HIV in the Soviet Union, as well as a lack of accurate data on the at-risk groups: injecting drug users (IDUs), men who have sex with men (MSM), and prostitutes.  In 1988, it was estimated that the incidence of homosexuality in the population was only 1 in 100,000, and the existence of sex workers and drug addicts were also grossly underestimated. The size of the IDU population was even more underestimated than the other groups

In 1988, the incidence of intravenous drug use was considered to be extremely low, but in 1990, with the collapse of Soviet Union, the veil of ignorance was partially lifted, and the official number of registered drug users measured 300,000. Nevertheless, this number is considered to be artificially low, with Soviet police having estimated the real number of addicts to be ten times as large. The authorities' neglect and near denial of the existence of these groups complicated the problems they faced as they came to grips with the existence of the HIV epidemic itself. Officials were unsure whom to test for HIV, due to never having kept track of the at-risk populations previously. Furthermore, individuals who belong to one of the at-risk groups were unlikely to independently seek treatment, due to both poor public awareness of the disease, as well as a fear of the stigma they would face if they came forward.

Russian Federation
 
In 2002, the Russian government collaborated with the World Bank to form a joint project to combat the rise of both tuberculosis and HIV/AIDS in the Russian Federation, funded in part by a loan from the bank of $150 million, and in part by the Russian treasury.  This project was stipulated to last from 2003–2008, with the aim of bridging the gap between needs and current practices in fighting both diseases.  The objectives of the project, as named by the World Bank in the original loan agreement, were to "contain the growth" of the epidemics in the short term, and to "halt and reverse" the course of the epidemics in the medium term. A long-term objective is conspicuously absent. The fact that the project lacked a long-term objective is perhaps alarming, considering the obstacles the bank hopes to help Russia overcome through its loan. These obstacles were, in full: "inadequate response, both in scale and in technical quality, to tackle the large burden of TB and HIV/AIDS/STIs", "the need for stronger management and institutional capacity for rapid implementation of large-scale programs, based on scientific evidence, across the vast expanse of Russia", and last but not least "financial constraints". Little is said throughout the document on the exact nature of the "financial constraints" to be overcome. Russia must begin paying back the loan immediately in 2008, through 2020. The long-term effect of the loan repayment on Russia's effort to combat these diseases may be significant, especially considering the fact that financial difficulties were an obstacle at the outset.

One of the major areas in which the project intended to combat the spread of HIV was through interventions targeted at high risk sectors of the population. These interventions have been shown in the international literature to be highly effective at combating the spread of the disease, and the World Bank clearly communicated its intention to implement evidence-based programs, such as targeted interventions, through the project. The key demographic to reach with targeted interventions is the population of intravenous drug users.  At the time the agreement was made, various estimates placed the percentage of the HIV positive population that are IDUs at 70–95%, making IDUs by far the most at-risk group. For this reason, interventions such as syringe exchange programs are listed as a high priority, with the goal of creating "approximately thirty (30) harm reduction programs for IDUs, and for the establishment of a federal HIV/AIDS and STI coordination center for training in high risk group prevention activities". Despite these optimistic goals, even in the beginning, the project proposal makes clear that there will be significant cultural stigmas and prejudices to overcome, especially in relation to drug users and homosexuals, in order to implement targeted interventions. Contemporary Russia still possesses "a strong legacy of health services in the Soviet model, which is often at odds with contemporary approaches to evidence-based control of infectious diseases." This vestigial approach to health care in the face of a rapidly growing epidemic has "contributed to a tension between a need for evidence-based disease control and traditional practices of doubtful effectiveness or potential harmfulness". Thus the World Bank expressed its doubts even before the project was implemented.

In the review of the results of the loan agreement, the World Bank deemed the project to be overall a success. This favorable appraisal was mainly due to the success of the TB portion of the project, as Russia conspicuously failed to establish targeted control interventions for IDUs to combat HIV/AIDS. The report reveals that the World Bank originally underestimated the "political and public reaction to harm reduction activities for high-risk groups such as IDUs". The attempts made by the bank to advocate for harm reduction programs failed to dispel the beliefs that IDUs are socially deviants, and that fighting HIV/AIDS within the IDU population is not worthwhile. "In fact, to some extent, this perception continues today". Therefore, in spite of the original plan to implement approximately 30 different harm reduction programs to help IDUs throughout Russia, the scope of targeted interventions was "limited to needs assessment of readiness of regional institutions to launch HIV prevention interventions in high risk groups (harm reduction programs) and development and approval of methodological recommendations", in short, no new interventions or harm reduction programs for IDUs were effectively implemented. Thus, the World Bank admitted that in retrospect its original plans may have been "over ambitious" and that "TB and HIV/AIDS remain significant threats to health and development in the Federation."

In 2007, 83% of HIV infections in Russia were registered among IDUs, 6% among sex workers, and 5% among prisoners, though as of 2010 the share of IDUs had gone down to ca. 70%. In 2007, 93.19% of adults and children with advanced HIV infection were receiving antiretroviral therapy. The official number of registered HIV-infected people — 703,781 (22 November 2012)

Coordination of activities in responding to AIDS remains a challenge for Russia, despite increased efforts. In 2006, treatment for some patients was interrupted due to delays in tender procedures and unexpected difficulties with customs. Additionally, lack of full commitment to an in-depth program for education on sex and drugs in schools hinders effective prevention programs for children. Education and knowledge in the general population surrounding HIV is limited. The Human Rights Commission comments that the low level of education may be an important determinant of discrimination and stigma experienced by people living with HIV/AIDs. In addition, prevention programs for high risk groups implemented by non-governmental organizations (NGOs) are impeded by lack of sustainability and government regulations, including difficult to meet requirements for reporting and severe penalties for non-compliance.

At the 2010 International AIDS Conference in Vienna, a representative of the Andrei Rylkov Foundation for Health and Social Justice, criticized Russian authorities for their harsh line on IDUs, which makes people in this high-risk group afraid of seeking out the health services they need, causing HIV rates to rise. A research project by NIBR in 2010 revealed that despite Federal authorities' increased efforts, there remains a systemic reluctance to fund programs targeted at risk groups, with big regional differences in level of commitment to and way of organizing campaigns and treatment. Influence of individuals at the local level and personal relations between key stakeholders in different regions seem to be of core importance. The NIBR project found that the 'bottleneck' is at the elite level rather than the popular level: representative surveys in Arkhangelsk and St. Petersburg found that 90% supported education on sexual issues in the schools, more than 70% supported needle exchange-programs, and a majority supported methadone treatment – despite the latter being illegal in Russia today. Because of official opposition to the dispensation of legal opioids for the treatment of heroin addiction, fearing diversion of such drugs, Russia approved the use of Vivitrol, an extended release version of the opioid antagonist naltrexone. Another harm reduction program for IDUs, syringe exchange programs are currently not illegal in Russia, however, they face barriers to continued sustainability, primarily lack of funding. The Russian government also declined to fund needle and syringe exchange programs after Global Fund support was discontinued in 2011, leading to the closure of many of the programs.

Current interventions that have been tested include targeted interventions that address the needs of specific populations, including gender specific interventions, and an intervention implemented in Orenburg, the "Follow the Voice of Life" program which is aimed at preventing HIV among MSM and empowering them to reduce their risk.  The program uses peer counseling, community mobilization and advocacy to lobby for the needs of MSM around HIV. Peer education is another model which has been found to show promise  in reducing IDUs risk for HIV, and has been studied across several randomized control trials. In these programs, IDUs are trained in harm reduction skills building and motivated to spread this message throughout their network, and as such, it an approach that capitalizes on both the social network of IDUs, as well as the credibility lent to information that comes from peers. Finally, programs that introduce brief HIV prevention counseling into settings that individuals are already frequenting, such as health clinics or STI clinics have been proven to show some level of efficacy in the literature. All of the programs and interventions face barriers to sustainability however, primarily around issues of funding.

According to Vadim Pokrovskiy from Federal HIV Center by 2019 the number of HIV infections will reach 2 million and infections are most prevalent among males aged 30–34, out of which 3% are infected. Infection rate among females in the same age range reaches 1.5%. Of those reported as infected throughout 2014, 57% acquired the infection through drug use, 1% through male homosexual contacts and 40% through heterosexual contacts. Availability of HIV treatment drug also declined in 2013–2014 due to economic situation and systemic issues in the health care management and only 30% of those diagnosed with HIV who need medication actually receive it.

The conspiracy theories on HIV returned into the public discourse with the degradation of Russia–European Union relations in 2014–2015. Opinions of the medical community, like Vadim Pokrovskiy cited above, are countered by political activists who present HIV epidemics a "a tool of Western information war" and propose promotion of "traditional values" as an instrument to reduce number of infections rather than the "Western" methods such as "absolute priority for rights of the high-risk groups such as drug users and LGBT".

Russia is also targeted by conspiracy theories from the HIV denialism movement. While a small movement worldwide it has attracted significant public attention in recent times. In April 2019, two Siberian women had refused treatment and were reported to have died afterwards. A well-known activist from the Irkutsk region also refused treatment for her HIV positive child. Another Irkutsk woman was convicted of negligence for refusing treatment for her four-month-old daughter, who died of complications from AIDS in 2018 it is reported. The movement is well-represented in social media. A popular group on Vkontakte called "HIV Aids is the greatest hoax of the XX century" with over 16 thousand followers. The page prominently links to House of Numbers, a 2009 documentary coming from the United States about HIV/AIDS by filmmaker Brent Leung which is heavily criticized by media around the world.

A number of regions in Russian are officially classified as being in state of generalized epidemic, which is announced when over 1% of overall inhabitants are HIV-positive – 1.7% for example in Sverdlovsk Oblast. Other regions include Kemerovo, Tomsk, Novosibirsk, Chelyabinsk, Samara, Irkutsk, Kurgan oblasts, Altai, Perm and Krasnoyarsk krais.

Recent data on the epidemics
In 2015 44% of new infections occurred through heterosexual sex. Experts predict that heterosexual sex may soon overtake injecting drug use as the main means of HIV transmission. This means the HIV epidemic may be shifting from mainly affecting key populations including people who inject drugs, sex workers, prisoners and men who have sex with men, to affecting the general population.

According to data published in 2019 amount of infected reached 1.06 million, there were 37 thousand deaths from AIDS in 2018. Infection rate in male population aged 30–40 is estimated about 4%. 57% acquired infection in heterosexual contacts, 2–3% in MSM contacts and 40–41% from drug use.

See also
 Health in Russia

References

External links
 HealthRight International - NGO working to address HIV/AIDS in Russia
 Russian Federal HIV center.

 
Health in Russia